"Young Hearts Run Free" is a disco song written by David Crawford and originally recorded by American soul singer Candi Staton in 1976. In 1996, it was covered by American house music singer Kym Mazelle for the triple-platinum selling soundtrack of Romeo + Juliet. Rolling Stone ranked "Young Hearts Run Free" number 150 their list of "200 Greatest Dance Songs of All Time" in 2022.

Candi Staton version
"Young Hearts Run Free" is a disco pop-funk track written and produced by David Crawford. According to Staton, the song's genesis was a conversation she had with Crawford over lunch in Los Angeles: Staton – "Dave Crawford was always asking me: 'What's happening in your life'...and I was [then] with someone I shouldn't have been with and it was hard getting out of that...very abusive relationship" "I [noticed] that [Crawford] was taking notes, and he said, 'You know, I'm gonna write you a song. I'm gonna write you a song that's gonna last forever'".

Released in 1976 from the album of the same title, it spent a week at number one on the Hot Soul Singles chart. It also peaked at number twenty on the Billboard Hot 100 singles chart. Along with the tracks "Run to Me" and "Destiny", "Young Hearts Run Free" went to number eight on the dance/disco charts. "Young Hearts Run Free" was one of only two songs by Staton to reach the top 10 on the UK Singles Chart, it peaked at number two behind The Real Thing's "You to Me Are Everything".  The 1976 single releases had "I Know" on the B-side.

The song is referenced in Staton's 1978 single "Victim" in the lyrics, "I became a victim of the very song I sing,
I told you 'young hearts run free'. When I didn't listen to myself . . ."
It was used in the 2009 video game Grand Theft Auto: The Ballad of Gay Tony on the in-game radio station K109 The Studio.

In the 2018 documentary Studio 54, "Young Hearts Run Free" plays during the closing credits.

Critical reception 
The Guardian said the song "sounds blissful – as if specifically designed to waft out of radios during the sweltering summer of 1976 – but the lyrics are a rueful, downcast cautionary tale of 'lost and lonely' marital discord and years 'filled with tears'." Rolling Stone called it, "still one of the greatest, soaring and melancholy, with Staton's vocal almost unbearably felt".

Charts

Certifications

Kym Mazelle version

"Young Hearts Run Free" was covered by American house music singer Kym Mazelle and released in 1996 as the second single for the triple-platinum selling soundtrack of Romeo + Juliet by Capitol Records. On August 15, 1997, Mazelle performed the song on the UK's Top of the Pops. The single has since become one of Mazelle's signature hits. In 1998, the song was included on the director's remix album Something for Everybody. In December 2005, Mazelle performed a short version of the song during her guest appearance as a contestant on The Weakest Link during the "Rock and Pop Special".

Critical reception
J.D. Considine from The Baltimore Sun viewed the cover version as a "game but unnecessary remake". A reviewer from Music Week gave it three out of five, noting that here, Nellee Hooper is at the controls for Mazelle's "pumped up version of the soul classic", lifted from the Romeo + Juliet soundtrack." Alan Jackson from The Times commented, "And yet another, with Candi Staton's glorious original subjected to house frenzy." In 2012, Australian music channel Max featured Mazelle's version of "Young Hearts Run Free" in their list of "1000 Greatest Songs of All Time".

Music video
The music video features Mazelle in a sleeveless dress wearing gold jewelry as well as a burgundy dress in other scenes. The video was filmed in late 1996. Several scenes and footage from the Romeo + Juliet film appear in the video. The video also features a crossdresser (Harold Perrineau as Mercutio), in a white outfit wearing a platinum blonde afro wig, miming to Mazelle's voice.

Track listing
 Maxi-single
"Young Hearts Run Free" (Album Version) – 3:59
"Young Hearts Run Free" (Kiss My Brass – Main Vox Edit) – 3:45
"Young Hearts Run Free" (Young Hearts Dub Free - Underground Dub) – 6:10
"Young Hearts Run Free" (Kiss My Brass Main Vox) – 8:10

Charts

Certifications

References

External links
[ Song review]

1976 singles
1986 singles
1981 singles
1997 singles
1999 singles
Disco songs
1976 songs
Warner Records singles
Capitol Records singles
Songs written by Dave Crawford (musician)